Yang Zhong (楊忠, 507 – 17 August 568), Xianbei name Puliuru Nunu (普六茹奴奴), formally known as Duke of Sui (隨國公), was a soldier, later general of the Northern Wei dynasty. He is the father of Yang Jian, the founder of the Sui dynasty.

Life 
Yang Zhong was  Yang Zhen's son, titled General of Ningyuan County (寧遠將軍). He is described as a tall handsome man with a long beard.

After the establishment of the Northern Zhou dynasty, Yang Zhong was appointed as a marshal and commanded more than ten generals including Yang Zuan (楊纂), Li Mu (李穆), Wang Jie (王傑), Tian Hong (田弘), and Murong Yan (慕容延). Later, together with the 100,000 troops of the Turkic Khanate, they attacked Jinyang, a city located in Northern Qi. In the Northern Zhou dynasty, Yang Zhong was named Duke of Chenliu (陳留郡公), later changed to Duke of Sui (隨國公).

After his son became emperor, he was honored with the title of Emperor Wuyuan (武元皇帝) and Lady Lü, his legal wife and the biological mother of Yang Jian, was named Empress Yuanming (元明皇后呂氏).

Research 
According to the Book of Zhou and Book of Sui, Yang Zhong was born in the Yang clan of Hongnong (弘農楊氏), but this statement is difficult to confirm.

Chen Yinke (陈寅恪), a Chinese historian, did not agree that Yang Jian's family was born in Wuchuan County, Inner Mongolia. According to him, Yang Zhong was from a Han Chinese family. Judging from the intermarriage practice of families at that time, Yang Zhong may have been born in the Yang clan of Shandong (山东杨氏).

However, scholar Wang Tongling (王桐齡) deduced that Yang Jian's family might have Xianbei blood, or perhaps even purely Xianbei, leading to the belief that he was born in the Yang clan of Hongnong.

Family 
Consort and their respective issue(s):

 Empress Yuanming, of the Lü clan (元明皇后呂氏), personal name Kutao (苦桃)
 Princess Cheng'an (成安公主), first daughter
 married Dou Rongding (窦荣定), Duke of Chenyi (陈懿公), and had issue (three sons including Dou Kang).
 Yang Jian (楊堅, 21 July 541 – 13 August 604), Emperor Wen of Sui (隋文帝), first son
 Yang Zheng (楊整, 540 – 576), Prince Jing of Cai (蔡景王), second son
 Yang Zan (楊瓚, 550 – 16 September 591), Prince Mu of Teng (滕穆王), third son
 Princess Changle (昌乐公主), second daughter
 married Dou Lutong (豆卢通), Duke Chen of Nan (南陈郡公), and had issues (a son).
 Lady Li, of the Li clan of Longxi (隴西李氏)
 Yang Song (楊嵩), Prince Xuan of Dao (道宣王), fourth son
 Yang Shuang (楊爽), Prince Zhao of Wei (衛昭王), fifth son
 Unknown
 Princess Yang (楊氏), third daughter
 married Li Licheng (李礼成), Duke Jun of Jiang(绛郡公)

References 

507 births
568 deaths